Raúl Brindis (born August 17, 1963 in Matamoros, Tamaulipas) is a Mexican radio and TV personality. His show, "El Show de Raul Brindis" runs weekday mornings on KLTN and UniMas in Houston, Texas.  His show is broadcast through Univision Radio's network from 5:00 AM to 11:00 AM in the following cities: Austin, Albuquerque, Chicago, Dallas, El Paso, Fresno, Houston, Indianapolis, Las Vegas, Los Angeles, McAllen, Laredo,  New York, Phoenix, San Antonio, San Diego, San Francisco. Raul began his radio career in 1984.

In addition to being the host of Univision Radio's primary entertainment show in Central United States, Raul is an avid singer and songwriter.  He has released several music and reflection albums under Mexican label Disa Records, part of Univision Music Group, including Las Más Solicitadas de la Radio (2003), Otra Noche Más Sin Tí (2004), and Reflexiones, Vol. 2: Las Más Solicitadas de la Radio (2006). Raul has a Bachelor's degree in Civil Engineering from the Instituto Tecnologico de Matamoros.

Raul Brindis served as a judge on Univision's ¡Viva el Sueño!, a reality competition to find new solo musical talent during the year 2009. He also served as guest judge in Univision's Objetivo Fama, a singing talent contest that has aired in Telefutura in the United States.

References

1964 births
Living people
People from Matamoros, Tamaulipas
Mexican radio presenters
Mexican television presenters